Centennial Collegiate Vocational Institute is a secondary high school located in ward five of Guelph, Ontario, Canada. Centennial offers many programs including science, math, business, English, French, and Japanese. The school colours are purple and gold.

History
The school is located in the south side of the city of Guelph, Ontario, Canada. Centennial was opened in 1967, 100 years after Canadian Confederation, as indicated by its name and is operated by the Upper Grand District School Board. The high school was ranked 3rd of 719 in the Fraser Institute Report Card on Ontario Secondary School's 2007 Edition.

Some former Centennial students have gone on to become successful in their careers. One example of this is Victor Davis, who was a successful Canadian swimmer, and Olympic Medalist.

Notable alumni
Thomas Dimitroff - General Manager of the Atlanta Falcons
George McPhee - General Manager of the Vegas Golden Knights NHL franchise, 
David Gibbins - Novelist and archaeologist
Victor Davis - Olympic swimmer/medalist
Scott Diamond - Toronto Blue Jays pitcher
Bladee - Rapper/Hip-hop Artist

See also
List of high schools in Ontario

References

External links
 Centennial Collegiate Vocational Institute

High schools in Guelph
1967 establishments in Ontario
Educational institutions established in 1967